Piramidalny is a rural locality (a settlement) in Sovkhozskoye Rural Settlement, Nikolayevsky District, Volgograd Oblast, Russia. The population was 23 as of 2010.

Geography 
Piramidalny is located 66 km southeast of Nikolayevsk (the district's administrative centre) by road. Razdolnoye is the nearest rural locality.

References 

Rural localities in Nikolayevsky District, Volgograd Oblast